The following is a complete list of the presidents of the University of North Dakota, located in Grand Forks, North Dakota. Dr. Andrew Armacost was selected as the 13th president on December 3, 2019.

{| class="wikitable"
!
!President
!Term
|-
|1st
|William M. Blackburn
|1884 - 1885
|-
|Acting
|Henery Montgomery
|1885 - 1887
|-
|2nd
|Homer Sprague
|1887 - 1891
|-
|3rd
|Webster Merrifield
|1891 - 1909
|-
|4th
|Frank L. McVey
|1909 - 1917
|-
|Acting
|Earl Babcock
|1917 - 1918
|-
|5th
|Thomas F. Kane
|1918 - 1933
|-
|6th
|John C. West
|1933 - 1954
|-
|7th
|George Starcher
|1954 - 1971
|-
|8th
|Thomas J. Clifford
|1971 - 1992
|-
|9th
|Kendall Baker
|1992 - 1999
|-
|10th
|Charles E. Kupchella
|1999 - 2008
|-
|11th
|Robert Kelley
|2008 - 2016
|-
|Acting
|Ed Schafer
|2016
|-
|12th
|Mark Kennedy
|2016–2019
|-
|Acting
|Joshua Wynne
|2019
|-
|13th
|Andrew Armacost
|2019–Present
|}

External links
Pictures of the UND Presidents

 
University
North Dakota, University Of